Pyrenopsis is a genus of fungi within the family Lichinaceae. It contains 10 species.

References

External links
Pyrenopsis at Index Fungorum

Lichinomycetes
Lichen genera
Taxa described in 1858
Taxa named by William Nylander (botanist)